Eternal Youth is the second studio album by American indie pop band Future Bible Heroes. It was released in 2002 on Instinct Records. The album was sung entirely by band member Claudia Gonson.

Track listing
All songs written by Stephin Merritt and Christopher Ewen.
"Losing Your Affection" – 4:50
"The Slow Fade" – 0:52
"Doris Daytheearthstoodstill" – 4:07
"A Thousand Lovers in a Day" – 2:58
"Bathysphere" – 0:49
"I'm a Vampire" – 3:23
"From Some Dying Star" – 3:16
"Viennese Lift" – 0:42
"Smash the Beauty Machine" – 3:12
"The Control Room" – 0:39
"Find an Open Window" – 3:17
"Kiss Me Only with Your Eyes" – 3:51
"Jakarta" – 0:47
"No River" – 3:29
"Cartoon" – 0:21
"The World Is a Disco Ball" – 2:41

Personnel
Future Bible Heroes
Claudia Gonson – vocals
Stephin Merritt – lyrics
Christopher Ewen – instrumentation

References

2002 albums
Future Bible Heroes albums
Instinct Records albums